The 3M bookshelf game series is a set of strategy and economic games published in the 1960s and early 1970s by 3M Corporation. The games were packaged in leatherette-look large hardback book size boxes in contrast to the prevalent wide, flat game boxes. The series grew to encompass over three dozen games. Most were multi-player board games or card games; a few were trivia games or two-handed board games. Acquire and TwixT were among the best-selling titles. The series later became part of the Avalon Hill Bookcase games. Very few of these games are still being published.

The line consisted of republished classics such as Go, chess and backgammon as well as original games. The Bookshelf games were originally in large boxes (8.5"x12"x2.25"); later, a series in smaller boxes called "gamettes" was introduced. The early ones were packaged in a different shape box called a "butterbox".

History
In 1962, 3M commissioned game designers Alex Randolph and Sid Sackson to design the early games and they were largely responsible for shaping the direction of the line towards abstract strategy and economic games. Randolph eventually produced TwixT, Oh-Wah-Ree, Breakthru, Evade, Jati and Mad Mate. Sackson contributed Acquire, Bazaar, Monad, Executive Decision, Sleuth, and Venture. 3M thereafter relied extensively on freelance designers for the later bookshelf games. Between 400 and 600 submissions were received every year by the company. A few of the more popular games with established sales were acquired from other companies.

The games were produced by 3M from 1962 to 1975, under the complete company name, The Minnesota Mining & Manufacturing Company. Only about ten of the games were significant commercial successes.

By the mid-1970s, gaming trends had shifted to pen-and-paper role playing games and the 3M game division was suffering losses. In 1976, the entire line was sold to Avalon Hill, which produced a competing line of bookcase games. Avalon Hill discontinued most of them, but continued to publish some until 1998, when it was sold by its parent company to Hasbro. While Acquire was mildly re-themed and published by Hasbro/Avalon Hill in 2000, the company has indicated that they have no plans to publish any of the 3M or Avalon Hill bookshelf games.

Since 2008, Acquire has been published by the Hasbro subsidiary Wizards of the Coast. TwixT has been published by a succession of German companies including Schmidt Spiele and Kosmos under license.

A few of the games that were not acquired by Hasbro, such as Facts in Five and Executive Decision, have since been published by University Games in a bookshelf format. Like the 3M series, they are designed to mimic the appearance of a large hardcover book, but instead of a slip-case, the games use a magnetic closing flap.

List of games
The bookshelf games series included the following games,

Unpublished games
 Options (1970), a game similar to Scrabble using number tiles instead of letters
 Mad Mate, also known as Crazyhouse
 Jati (1965), a 2-handed board game (prototype only)

Bookshelf series

 Acquire (1964), 2—6 player board game
 Backgammon, 2 player board game
 Bazaar 2 (1967), 6 player token trading game
 Breakthru (1965), {Hnefatafl} 2 player board game
 Challenge Bridge (1973), {contract bridge} 4 player tournament simulation card game
 Challenge Football (1973), 2 player simulation dice/card game
 Challenge Golf at Pebble Beach (1973), 1—4 player simulation dice game
 Chess 2 player board game
 Contigo {Mancala} (1974), 2—4 player board game
 Events (1974), 4—8 player trivia game
 Executive Decision (1971), 2—6 player board game
 Facts in Five (1964), 2+ player trivia game
 Feudal (1967), 2 or 4 sides, 2 - 6 player board game
 Foil (1968), 2—4 player card game
 Go, 2 player board game
 High Bid (1963), 2 - 5 player card and dice game
 Image (1971), 2—6 player card game
 Jati (1965),
 Jumpin (1964), 2 player board game
 Mr. President (1965) 2—4 player card game
 Mr. President (1967)
 Oh-Wah-Ree (1962), {Mancala} 2—4 player board game
 Options: Strategic Game of Numbers (1970)
 Phlounder (1962), 2—6 player board game
 Ploy {chess} (1970), 2 or 4 player board game
 Point of Law (1972), 2+ player trivia game
 Quinto (1964), 2—4 player board game
 Regatta - 2—6 player board game
 Stocks & Bonds (1964), 2—8 player card game
 TwixT (1962), 2 player board game

Gamette series

Notes:
 Foil and High Bid were both full size bookshelf games and gamette games.
 If a game was a recognizable derivative of a classic game, the name of the classic game is in brackets
 Games where a board is not essential for play are classified as card games or trivia games

See also
Eurogame, a style of gaming of which Acquire was a popular example
List of Avalon Hill games, which the 3M games became part of

References

External links

 

History of board games